Deir ez-Zor Governorate ( / ALA-LC: Muḥāfaẓat Dayr az-Zawr) is one of the fourteen governorates (provinces) of Syria. It is situated in eastern Syria, bordering Iraq. It has an area of 33,060 km2 (12,760 sq mi) and a population of 1,239,000 (2011 estimate). The capital is Deir ez-Zor. It is divided roughly equally from northwest to southeast by the Euphrates. Most of the territory on the river's left (northwest) bank is part of the Autonomous Administration of North and East Syria, while that on the right (southeast) bank is controlled by the Syrian government.

Districts 

The governorate is divided into three districts (manatiq). The districts are further divided into 14 sub-districts (nawahi):

 Deir ez-Zor District (7 sub-districts)
 Deir ez-Zor Subdistrict
 Al-Kasrah Subdistrict
 Al-Busayrah Subdistrict
 Al-Muhasan Subdistrict
 Al-Tabni Subdistrict
 Khasham Subdistrict
 Al-Suwar Subdistrict

 Abu Kamal District (4 sub-districts)
 Abu Kamal Subdistrict
 Hajin Subdistrict
 Al-Jalaa Subdistrict
 Al-Susah Subdistric
 Mayadin District (3 sub-districts)
 Mayadin Subdistrict
 Diban Subdistrict
 Al-Asharah Subdistrict

History 
 
On 6 September 2007 Israel attacked and destroyed a facility  in the governorate that Israel claimed was a nuclear site in Operation Outside the Box. The complex was suspected of holding nuclear materials from North Korea. In 2011, the IAEA confirmed it had been a nuclear weapons site.

Syrian Civil War 
In the course of Syrian Civil War, as the Syrian Army has concentrated its forces on wresting back control of Aleppo, rebels have slowly gained ground in the eastern tribal heartland, aiming to control  the country's 200,000 barrel-a-day oil output. In August 2012, units of the Free Syrian Army (FSA) targeted the remaining isolated outposts of the Syrian Army forces in north-east Syria, where the FSA controls all the main roads. There were said to be only 3 Army outposts left in Deir ez-Zor province countryside and they were under attack. On November 30, 2012, Syrian troops withdrew from Omar oil field, one of the last regime positions east of Deir ez-Zor city near the Iraqi border. This meant that the rebels controlled the country's major fields. This happened after Syrian troops lost the Conoco gas reserve on November 27. The insurgents took control of an oil field for the first time on November 4 when they overran Al-Ward, the most important in the province. After also losing control of Al-Jofra field also in November, the army controlled not more than five fields, all located to the west of Deir ez-Zor city. Residents in Deir ez-Zor used crude oil for heating and agriculture for lack of fuel On 1 January 2013, it was reported that two thirds of Deir ez-Zor Governorate was under rebel control.

Siege of Deir ez-Zor 

On April 11, 2014, Islamic State of Iraq and the Levant (ISIL) withdrew from Abu Kamal to the T2 oil site, where a Syria-Iraq pipeline runs. On 3 July, Syrian Organisation for Human Rights (SOHR) said  that all towns and villages on the route from Abu Kamal to Al-Bab, passing through Raqa province, were now under ISIL control. Only the provincial capital Deir ez-Zor and the military airport were not under ISIL control. The city of Deir ez-Zor was split between President Bashar al-Assad's forces and an amalgam of rebel groups. In 2014 ISIL forces massacred an estimated 900 members of the Al-Shaitat tribe in the governorate, following resistance to the group's control of the area. In early 2016, the forces of the Syrian Democratic Forces entered the governorate following the Al-Shaddadi offensive. Up until October 2017, ISIL controlled all of the countryside while Syrian Government forces held out in the capital. On 14 October 2017, Russia confirmed that Al-Mayadeen was recaptured by the Syrian army amid major offensive. The Syrian Army fully secured the Deir ez-Zor on 3 November  and on 17 November 2017, ISIL surrendered the island of Hawijat Kati, bringing all areas around the city under Army control following the two-month offensive. On 23 October 2017, the Syrian troops began an offensive towards Abu Kamal, being ISIL's last stronghold in the governorate. The city was captured on 19 November 2017 after changing hands three times.

ISIL insurgency in Deir ez-Zor 

In 2018 ISIL started insurgency in Deir ez-Zor.

Demographics 
Arabs constitute about 90% of the population of the governorate, a vast majority being Sunni Muslims. In the 1980s, some Arabs converted to Shia Islam whose population do not exceed 5,000. About a thousand Christians live in the governorate as well. 

The most significant Arab tribes are the Bu Kamal, the Shuwayt, Al-Shaitat, Bakir, Bu Kamil, Mashahda, Bu Khabour, Qaraan and Bu Hassan who all are part of the 'Egaidat confederation. Beside the 'Egaidat confederation, other tribes include the Al-Baggara, Abeed, Kul’ayeen, and Albu Saraya.

Historic Sites 
 Dura-Europos
 Synagogue of Dura-Europas
 Mari

See also
 Sanjak of Zor
 2017 Deir ez-Zor missile strike

References

External links
edeiralzor The First Complete website for Deir ez-Zor  news and services

 
Governorates of Syria
Upper Mesopotamia